The Silvrettahorn is a mountain of the Silvretta Alps, located on the border between Switzerland and Austria. On its southern Swiss side it overlooks the Silvretta Glacier.

References

External links

Silvrettahorn on Hikr

Mountains of the Alps
Alpine three-thousanders
Mountains of Vorarlberg
Mountains of Switzerland
Mountains of Graubünden
Silvretta Alps
Austria–Switzerland border
Klosters-Serneus